The 2015–16 Southern Hemisphere tropical cyclone season may refer to one of three different basins and respective seasons:

2015–16 Australian region cyclone season, between 90°E and 160°E
2015–16 South Pacific cyclone season, east of 160°E

Two South Atlantic tropical cyclone formed during this time period, Subtropical Storm Deni and Eçaí